Kurunegala is a major city in Sri Lanka. It is the capital city of the North Western Province and the Kurunegala District. Kurunegala was an ancient royal capital for 50 years, from the end of the 13th century to the start of the 14th century. It is at the junction of several main roads linking to other important parts of the country.

There are eight very noticeable large rocks that encircle and dominate the city. Kurunegala's rocks rise from the plain below and have characteristic names, six of which come from the animals that they are imagined to represent. The largest among them is Ethagala or the "Elephant Rock" (though the translation is actually tusker), reaches . The shape of Ethagala resembles an elephant.

Etymology 
Kurunegala has been named after the Elephant rock (ඇතුගල). "Kurune" means tusker or an elephant with protruding teeth and gala in Sinhala means rock. Kurunai means tusker or an Elephant and gal in Tamil means rock or hill. Kurunegala's old name was Hasthishaila-pura, which can be translated as 'The City of the Elephant Rock' in Sanskrit. In some ancient literature, the word Athugal-pura (ඇතුගල්පුර) is employed to describe the city of Kurunegala.

Nearby are three archeological cities — Parakramapura (Panduvasnuwara, පඬුවස්නුවර) (northwest) with remains of a moated palace and monasteries from the 12th century, Dambadeniya (දඹ‍‍‍‍දෙනිය) (southwest, mid-13th century) and Yapahuwa (north).

Kurunegala enjoys a pleasant location with huge rocky outcrops some of which have been given names of the animals they resemble: elephant rock, tortoise rock etc. According to folklore legend, a long time back the city had a severe drought. To exacerbate matters for humans, animals had threatened the city's storage capabilities by consuming huge amounts of water. A witch volunteered to alleviate the problem, transforming some of the animals magically into stone figures.

History 

Kurunegala had a citadel in the 13th century. Its ascendancy as an ancient capital of Sri Lanka began with a series of events that took place during the late 12th century at Yapahuwa. The sacred tooth relic which was in the Yapahuwa Kingdom was taken by an Aryacakravarti from the Jaffna Kingdom to the Pandyan country during the rule of Buwaneka Bahu I from 1272 to 1284. The relic was brought back by King Parakrama Bahu III who ruled from Kurunegala between 1287 and 1293. Over the next half a century Kurunegala was the capital and the governing centre for three other kings of Sri Lanka.

After the death of King Parakrama Bahu III, kings Buvanekabahu II (1293–1302) who was followed by Parakramabahu IV (1302–1326) ruled from Kurunegala. The ruler in Kurunegala from 1326 to 1335 was Buwaneka Bahu III alias Wanni Buwaneka Bahu. He was the son of Pandith Parakrama Bahu II and is believed to be the last king to rule the country from Kurunegala.

After the reign of Buwaneka Bahu III, the newly throned king Vijayabahu V ruled from Dambadeniya and Yapahuwa from 1335 to 1341 before once again the kingdom of Sri Lanka shifted to Gampola.

Few remains of the Palace of the Tooth relic that housed the tooth of the Buddha have avoided natural destruction, including few stone steps and a part of a doorway.

Sites with archaeological significance

Royal complex 

Archaeological remains of this site are few but give a glimpse of its past glory and comprise the handsome stone entrance, steps, rock pillars and ruined walls of the royal palace and the palace of the tooth relic.

Kurunegala lake 

A large man-made water reservoir constructed by ancient kings. The lake is in the outskirts of the central business district accessible by the Kurunegala-Dambulla and Kurunegala-Puttlam roads. The tank is used as a water supply source for the city.

Kurunegala clock tower 

The Kurunegala clock tower was built in 1922 as a tribute to the officers, who were from Wayamba province and sacrificed their lives in World War I.

Geography and climate

Geography 
Topographically Kurunegala town is based on a plain area with the exception of the surrounding rock outcrops. The northern part of the town is slightly higher than the south. Kurunegala Lake is the primary geographical feature of Kurunegala and adorns the town. The region comprising the Kurunegala town is well above the sea level compared to the coastal areas of Sri Lanka. However, the region is not as high as the central hill country. The nearest beaches to Kurunegala are to the west and include Negombo and Chilaw.

Kurunegala is surrounded by several major rock outcrops, a distinctive geological feature of the Wayamba province.
 Ethagala (Elephant Rock)
 Ibbagala (Tortoise Rock)
 Andagala (Eel Rock)
 Elugala (Goat Rock)
 Kuruminiyagala (Beetle Rock)
 Wanduragala (Monkey Rock)
 Yakdessagala (Witch Rock)
 Gonigala (Sack Rock)
 Adhagala

Climate 
Kurunegala features a tropical rainforest climate under the Köppen climate classification. The city's climate is tropical and hot all throughout the year. The surrounding rocks play a major role in determining Kurunegala's weather since these rocks increase and retain the heat of the day. The only major change in the Kurunegala weather occurs during the monsoons from May to August and October to January when heavy rains can be expected. While the city does experience noticeably drier weather during January and February, it does not qualify as a true dry season as average precipitation in both months are above . In general, temperatures from late November to mid February period are lower than the rest of the year.

Demographics 

Kurunegala is a Sinhalese majority city; there are sizable communities belonging to other ethnic groups, such as Moors, Tamils, Burghers and Malays. Residents from ethnic minorities live in all parts of the city, however, sizeable communities of Moors and Tamils live in the areas of Teliyagonna and Wilgoda.

Ethnicity according to Kurunegala urban area (2015) 

Source: 2015 Census Data

Language 
The common languages of Kurunegala, depending on social classes, social circles, and ethnic backgrounds are Sinhalese, Tamil and English.

Religion 

Buddhism is the main and the most widely practiced religion in Kurunegala. The town is also home to a wide range of other religious faiths and sects including Hinduism, Christianity and Islam.

Prominent Buddhist temples in Kurunegala include Athkanda Raja Maha Viharaya. It is said that the fabled Jathaka stories were composed at this historic temple. The temple is located on the left hand side of the Kandy-Kurunegala main road in the vicinity of the Kurunegala town, Ibbagala Raja Maha Viharaya, Angangala cave temple, Wilbawa Purana Viharaya and Bauddhaloka Viharaya. An ancient replica of Buddha's footprint that is found on the summit of Sri Pada (Adam's Peak), a little dagoba and some paintings depicting the Buddha and his disciples can be seen at the Ibbagala Raja Maha Viharaya.

There are also numbers of Christian/Catholic churches, Mosques and Hindu temples are in the city. The Roman Catholic Diocese of Kurunegala's bishop is headquartered in the town. The Church of Ceylon, which is the Anglican Church in Sri Lanka, operates a diocese in Kurunegala covering the North-Central Province and Kurunegala, Kandy, Matale, Kegalle and  Anuradapura districts.

Administration 

The Kurunegala Municipality Council is responsible for the overall administration, sanitary, welfare, and other general activities of the city. The Municipality Council headed by a mayor with 21 other elected members. The 21 elected members represent the following wards:

 Gangoda
 Wewa
 Central
 Yanthampalawa
 Illuppugedara
 Madamegama
 Wehera
 Udawalpola
 Bazzar
 Gettuwana
 Polaththapitiya
 Teliyagonna (Upper)
 Teliyagonna (Lower)

Suburbs 

 Wanduragala (Kurunegala Pradeshiya Sabha)
 Malkaduwawa (Kurunegala Pradeshiya Sabha)
 Mallawapitiya (Kurunegala Pradeshiya Sabha)
 Millawa (Kurunegala Pradeshiya Sabha)
 Uyandana (Kurunegala Pradeshiya Sabha)
 Yaggapitiya (Kurunegala Pradeshiya Sabha)
 Maveedalupotha (Kurunegala Pradeshiya Sabha)
 Thittawella (Kurunegala Pradeshiya Sabha)
 Maspotha (Kurunegala Pradeshiya Sabha)
 Gepallawa (Polgahawela Pradeshiya Sabha)
 Piduruwella (Polgahawela Pradeshiya Sabha)
 Uhumeeya (Polgahawela Pradeshiya Sabha)
 Kiralabokka (Polgahawela Pradeshiya Sabha)
 Kalugamuwa (Polgahawela Pradeshiya Sabha)
 Dambokka (Kurunegala Pradeshiya Sabha)
 Hanhamuna (Wariyapola Pradeshiya Sabha)

Transportation 

Kurunegala is a central city in Sri Lanka. It is directly connected to a large number of major cities and towns of the island.

Kurunegala can be reached by the railway on the Northern railway line.

By road, it is connected to Colombo, Kandy, Matale,   Puttalam, Trincomalee, Negombo, Anuradhapura and Kegalle. Due to its status as a crossroads city, the city is a good base for exploring important ancient landmarks a short distance away.

The Kurunegala central bus stand, opened in 2005, is one of Sri Lanka's most efficient and modern bus stands, with a parking capacity of about 200 buses.

Central Expressway Construction

Under the directives of MoHEH, RDA has initiated a study to find out a suitable road corridor to construct the expressway from Kadawatha to Dambulla via Kurunegala under Central Expressway Project. The second stage of the construction of the Central Expressway Project (CEP Project-2) from Meerigama to Kurunegala was launched on 2017 February 1. Subsequently, the expressway will cross Gampaha, Meerigama, Kurunegala while ending at Dambulla. The project has been implemented in four stages; from Kadawatha to Mirigama (37 km), Mirigama to Kurunegala (39.28 km), Pothuhera to Galagedara (32.5 km) and Kurunegala to Dambulla (60.3 km). Expressway to Kurunegala was opened on 15 January 2022. Interchanges from Mirigama are Nakalagamuwa, Dambokka, Kurunegala and Yaggapitiya. Public transport was launched on 20 January 2022 through expressway.

Economy 
Many major corporations have large branch offices in Kurunegala and many industries including textiles, Sri Lankan gemstones, furniture, information technology, and jewellery are found there.

Health care 
The Teaching Hospital Kurunegala is the only one of that kind in NWP, is situated on the Colombo Kurunegala road about 0.75 k.m. away from the city towards Colombo. Teaching Hospital Kurunegala is one of the largest hospitals in Sri Lanka.
The bed count is over 1700 and the staff is over 3500. The hospital spreads over 35 acres land and serves people through more than 100 units. The teaching hospital Kurunegala caters more than 1.2 million patients annually. This number includes the patients from the other districts also, namely Anuradhapura, Polonnaruwa, Trincomalee, and Mathale.
There are some other leading private-sector health care service providers in north western province equipped with cutting-edge technology.

Education 
Kurunegala is home to some of the island's oldest and leading schools.

National schools 

 Bishop Lakdas de Mel College – Kurunegala
 D. B. Welagedara Central College - Kurunegala
 Defence Service College - Kurunegala
 D. S. Senanayake Central College - Kurunegala
 Hindu Tamil Maha Vidyalayam – Kurunegala
 Hisbullah Central College - Kurunegala
 Holy Family Convent – Kurunegala
 Madheena National School - Siyabalagaskotuwa
 Maliyadeva Adarsha Maha Vidyalaya - Kurunegala
 Maliyadeva Balika Vidyalaya – Kurunegala
 Maliyadeva College – Kurunegala
 President Girls College - Kurunegala
 Sir John Kotalawala College – Kurunegala
 Sri Nissanka Maha Vidyalaya – Kurunegala
 St. Anne's College – Kurunegala
 Vishvoda College - Kurunegala
 Wayamba Royal College – Kurunegala
 Zahira Central College - Kurunegala
 S. W. R. D. Bandaranayaka College - Kurunegala
 Athugalpura Prince College - Kurunegala

Private/international schools 

 Amana International School
 Cardiff International School
 Lexicon International School
 Lyceum International School
 Royal International School
 Sussex College Kurunegala
 Unique International College
 Wayamba International School

Tertiary education
The Wayamba University of Sri Lanka is situated in Kuliyapitiya, while the Open University of Sri Lanka, the Sri Lanka Institute of Information Technology, the National Institute of Business Management, the College of Technology, the National Apprentice Industrial Training Authority, the Wayamba Technical College, the National Youth Council and the Vocational Training Authority have centres in the city. Most of the private-sector higher educational institutions also have branches in Kurunegala.

Sports 

Major sporting venues in and around Kurunegala include:
 Welagedara Stadium is the top sporting venue in Kurunegala. It regularly hosts First Class Cricket matches that are international and local types.
 Maliga Pitiya Stadium 
St. Anne's College Sport Complex
Maliyadeva Ground

Kurunegala is one of the outstation cities that is popular for cricket and produced a number of cricketers that represented the nation. One of the best known spin bowlers of all time in Sri Lanka, Rangana Herath is an iconic cricketer from Kurunegala.

See also 
 List of cities in Sri Lanka
 Kurunegala Municipal Council
 Kurunegala train crash
 List of tallest statues
 Wayamba Cricket Team

References

External links 

 History and Heritage of Kurunegala

 
Provincial capitals in Sri Lanka
Populated places in North Western Province, Sri Lanka
Populated places in Kurunegala District